Port Fourchon is Louisiana’s southernmost port, located on the southern tip of Lafourche Parish, on the Gulf of Mexico. It is a seaport, with significant petroleum industry traffic from offshore Gulf oil platforms and drilling rigs as well as the Louisiana Offshore Oil Port pipeline. Fourchon's primary service markets are domestic deepwater oil and gas exploration, drilling, and production in the Gulf. Port Fourchon currently services over 90% of the Gulf of Mexico's deepwater oil production. There are over 600 oil platforms within a 40-mile radius of Port Fourchon. This area furnishes 16 to 18 percent of the US oil supply.

Port Fourchon is part of the Houma–Bayou Cane–Thibodaux Metropolitan Statistical Area.

History
Port Fourchon was developed as a multi-use facility. It has historically been a land base for offshore oil support services as well as a land base for the Louisiana Offshore Oil Port (LOOP). In addition, there is commercial and recreational fishing, a foreign cargo shipping terminal, and an area for recreation and tourism.

The Board of Commissioners of the Greater Lafourche Port Commission is charged with ensuring the progress and continued development of Port Fourchon and the South Lafourche Leonard Miller, Jr. Airport. Nine members seated at-large comprise the Commission in lettered seats A through I. Every six years, the people of the Tenth Ward of Lafourche Parish elect all nine commissioners.

The Greater Lafourche Port Commission, established by the state of Louisiana in 1960 as a political subdivision of the state of Louisiana, exercises jurisdiction over the Tenth Ward of Lafourche Parish south of the Intracoastal Waterway, including the seaport and the airport. The Port Commission facilitates the economic growth of the communities in which it operates by maximizing the flow of trade and commerce, largely through Port Fourchon. Bristow Helicopters and Petroleum Helicopters International Inc. both operate helicopters out of the heliport at Port Fourchon that ferry people and supplies to the Offshore Oil Drilling and Production Platform Rigs in the Gulf of Mexico, such at the BP Thunderhorse PDQ that lies 150 miles to the South.

Port Fourchon was damaged by Hurricane Lili in October 2002. It did not take a direct hit by Hurricane Katrina on August 29, 2005, and was only slightly damaged. Sixteen years after Katrina, the center of category 4 Hurricane Ida made landfall in Port Fourchon at 11:54 am CDT, August 29, 2021, with sustained winds of 150 mph (240 km/h).

Geography
Port Fourchon is a short distance off Louisiana Highway 1 (LA 1), the road to Grand Isle, via Louisiana Highway 3090. It is the southernmost point of Louisiana accessible by automobile.

As a critical infrastructure of national significance, LA 1 provides a vital link to Port Fourchon. As of mid-2008, $350 million from state bonds and federal assistance has been budgeted to begin replacing a 17-mile (27-km) stretch of LA 1, the road into Port Fourchon, because that part of the highway is not inside the hurricane levee system that protects inland communities, and the highway is prone to flooding from storm surge, even from tropical cyclones some distance away. The replacement will be an elevated highway that can stand up to a major storm and remain open even if the land around it floods. A seven-mile (11-km) section of the project from Leeville to Port Fourchon, including a higher bridge across Bayou Lafourche, is under construction and scheduled for completion in 2011; this segment will be funded by tolls. The bridge over Bayou Lafourche, funded by tolls, opened July 8, 2009. Funds have not been secured for the segment between Golden Meadow and Leeville.

See also
Louisiana International Gulf Transfer Terminal Regional Center
Port of New Orleans

References

External links

 Greater Lafourche Port Commission website
 Directions and info to the beach on lafishmag.com
 

Unincorporated communities in Lafourche Parish, Louisiana
Port cities and towns of the United States Gulf Coast
Unincorporated communities in Houma – Thibodaux metropolitan area
Unincorporated communities in Louisiana
Populated coastal places in Louisiana
Ports of the Gulf of Mexico